Suhum/Kraboa/Coaltar District is a former district that was located in Eastern Region, Ghana. Originally created as an ordinary district assembly in 1988, which was created from the former Suhum-Kraboa-Coaltar District Council. However on 28 June 2012, it was split off into two new districts: Suhum Municipal District (capital: Suhum) and Ayensuano District (capital: Coaltar). The district assembly was located in the southern part of Eastern Region and had Suhum as its capital town.

Geography
Suhum-Kraboa-Coaltar District shared boundaries with East Akim Municipal District to the north, Akuapim South Municipal District to the south, West Akim District and Kwaebibirem District to the west and New Juaben Municipal District and Akuapim North District to the east. Suhum-Kraboa-Coaltar District covered an area of 1,018 km². The river Densu is the largest water body within the district and flows from the northern part of the district to the southern part.

List of settlements
Suhum-Kraboa-Coaltar District was essentially a rural district with only Suhum (the capital) being classified as an urban area.

Sources
 
 District: Suhum-Kraboa-Coaltar Districts

References

Districts of the Eastern Region (Ghana)